Steve Kolander (born November 15, 1961, in Lake Charles, Louisiana) is an American country music artist. He debuted in 1994 with the release of his self-titled album on River North Records. It produced two singles on the Hot Country Songs charts. A second album for River North, Pieces of a Puzzle, was released in 1996, followed by the independently released Light to Dark in 2007.

Before he became a recording artist, Kolander worked as an advertising executive.

Discography

Albums

Singles

Music videos

References

External links
Official website

1961 births
American country singer-songwriters
Living people
Musicians from Lake Charles, Louisiana
Singer-songwriters from Louisiana
Country musicians from Louisiana